Gay Morning America was a weekly volunteer-run variety show that aired on Manhattan public-access cable for three seasons from 1983 to 1985. For the first two seasons, the show ran for one hour on Friday mornings from 7:30-8:30 am EST, and was reduced to a 1/2 hour time slot on Saturday mornings from 11:30 am to 12:00 pm EST in the third and final season. The show also featured commercials for Greenwich Village gay establishments, as well as endorsements by the hosts which helped support the show. It originally aired on channel 59, W59AT. The program's archives are held in the collection of The LGBT Community Center National History Archive.

History 

Gay Morning America was founded by George Sardi, Johnny Pool, and Lynn Lavner, all of whom either co-owned or frequently performed at the piano bar Waverly Waverly. The bar, situated at the corner of Waverly Place and Waverly Place in Greenwich Village, in Manhattan, New York, hosted regular cabaret-style performances. Though the clientele was largely gay, it was not exclusively so. The show was recorded live at Metro-Access Inc. at 110 E. 23rd Street in Manhattan, New York. Many of the episodes were not recorded, or have since been lost. Those that remain were donated by George Sardi to The Center in Greenwich Village.

Staff 
George Sardi; producer, host

Johnny Savoy; producer, host

Lynn Lavner; performer

Johnny Pool; performer

Jerry Fitzpatrick; performer

Lord Byron Falk; performer

Leslie Irons; performer

Jimmy Mellow, director

Segments 
Most shows began with opening credits and the show's theme song, which was written by Lynn Lavner, followed by a community news segment. Recurring segments included recipes with Johnny Pool, exercises with Lord Byron, theater reviews with Leslie Irons, "girl talk" with Lynn Lavner, and sports with Jerry Fitzpatrick. There were also often musical performances by Lavner and Jerry Scott, who regularly performed at Waverly Waverly, as well as interviews with special guests, who were usually local LGBT celebrities.

A large portion of the run-time of most episodes was devoted to commercials for local gay-owned business. These commercials were typically a screen showing the business's name, address, and phone number, while one of the hosts read ad copy. The most frequently featured establishments were bars which hosted live performances, like Waverly Waverly, Limelight, The Monster, The Follies, Peeches Three, and Copacabana Bar, though other gay-owned businesses were also featured, including The Village Apothecary, a pharmacy which specialized in HIV/ AIDS treatments. There were also often plugs for other gay resources, such as hotlines and publications like Gay Yellow Pages and Connection.

During the third and final season, every fourth show was a "phone-in" episode, during which viewers could call in and talk with the hosts and special guests. Usually, these discussions followed major events within the gay community.

Episodes 

* Denotes a "phone-in" show

References 

1983 establishments in New York City
1983 American television series debuts
1985 disestablishments in New York (state)
1985 American television series endings
1980s American LGBT-related television series
Gay-related television shows